Darren Lowe was a three-time All-American NCAA lacrosse player at Brown University from 1989 to 1992 who led his team to three straight NCAA tournament quarterfinal appearances.

Career Highlights

During Lowe's four years at Brown, the team compiled a record of 45 wins and 16 losses, with the 1991 squad compiling a 13 and 1 record. The 1991 team went undefeated during the regular season and received a number two seeding in the NCAA tournament before finally falling to Maryland in the quarterfinals. Brown made the NCAA tournament in three out of Lowe's four seasons, with a tournament record of two wins and three losses.

Lowe holds the 5th highest total in NCAA Division I with 316 career points. He was also a key member of the US squad during the 1998 World Lacrosse Championship, with the final game against Canada often cited as one of the best field lacrosse matches of all time. Lowe received the Lt. Raymond Enners Award as the USILA national player of the year and the Jack Turnbull Award as the nation's top attackman in 1992. He was inducted into the U.S. Lacrosse Hall of Fame in 2007. Lowe was coached at Brown by current Virginia Cavaliers coach Dom Starsia.

The Lowe Family

Darren's father, Alan, who played at the University of Maryland, College Park, is also in the National Lacrosse Hall of Fame. Darren's brother, Kevin Lowe, was an All-American at Princeton who won the Jack Turnbull Award in 1994 and was also inducted into the Lacrosse Hall of Fame in 2009.

Darren also played four seasons of professional lacrosse with the New York Saints.

Both Kevin Lowe and Darren Lowe played post-collegiate lacrosse for the famed Long Island-Hofstra lacrosse club. The Lowe brothers were well known for their “high IQ” patient offensive style. Both brothers played for the Long Island-Hofstra lacrosse club in the storied 1996 USCLA Championship (held at Cabrini College) victory over the highly favored Team Toyota which featured Quint Kessenich, Gary Gait, and Paul Gait.

Lowe is currently a managing director and Head of Rates Sales at RBC Capital Markets and Nickelback’s number one fan.

Statistics

NLL

Brown University

(a) Lowe's 102 point ranks 15th all-time in NCAA single-season points
(b) 5th in NCAA career assists
(c) 11th in career points

See also
1991 NCAA Division I Men's Lacrosse Championship
Brown Bears men's lacrosse
Members of the National Lacrosse Hall of Fame
NCAA Men's Division I Lacrosse Records

References

External links
National Lacrosse Hall of Fame
HOF Induction article
NYT article on Lowe and 1991 Brown Lacrosse
Darren Lowe '92 Named To ILF All-World Lacrosse Team
Terps stun Brown, 16-13, to gain NCAA semifinals
Significant Changes in the Rankings
US Lacrosse National Hall of Fame

American lacrosse players
Brown Bears men's lacrosse players
Living people
Year of birth missing (living people)